The Finke Desert Race, or Tatts Finke Desert Race, an off-road, multi-terrain two-day race for motorbikes, cars, buggies and quad bikes through desert country from Alice Springs to the small and remote community of Aputula (called Finke until the 1980s) in Australia's Northern Territory. The race is usually held each year on the Queen's Birthday long weekend in June. "Finke", as it is commonly known, is one of the biggest annual sporting events in the Northern Territory.

The track
Encompassing about 229 km each way, the Finke Desert Race travels through many properties on its way to end up crossing the Finke River just north of Aputula (previously known as Finke township).
The Track is divided into five sections:
 Start/Finish Line to Deep Well (61 km)
 Deep Well to Rodinga (31 km)
 Rodinga to Bundooma (43 km)
 Bundooma to Mount Squires (45 km)
 Mount Squires to Finke (49 km)

History

There and back 
The race started in 1976 as a "there and back" challenge for a group of local motorbike riders to race from Alice Springs Inland Dragway to the Finke River and return. After the success of this initial ride, the Finke Desert Race has been held annually on the Queen's Birthday long weekend ever since. The race is run along sections of the Central Australia Railway along a winding corrugated track, which snakes through typical outback terrain of red dirt, sand, spinifex, mulga and desert oaks. Even though the railway line was realigned and rebuilt in the early 1980s, with the old tracks being pulled up, the race continues along its original course.

King of the desert 
While originally the Finke was only a bike race, its increasing popularity saw the introduction of cars and off-road buggies in 1988. A rivalry developed between the two and four wheelers, as the buggies were keen to claim the holy grail of the race outright winner or "King of the Desert" as it is known. For 11 consecutive years the bikes were too quick for the cars despite the gap constantly narrowing. Finally in 1999, a buggy returned home first to claim the honour. With the bikes winning back the title in 2000 and 2001. From 2002 until 2004 the buggies held onto the "King of the Desert" title. In 2005 the title was changed to see two "Kings of the Desert", one for the cars and one for bikes, each picking up $10,000 for their effort. Although the bikes and cars no longer race against each other for the title, it is always interesting to see who completes the 460 km round trip quickest. The last bike to beat the cars time was Michael Vroom in 2001 on his Honda CR500.

COVID-19 impact 
The 2020 race was cancelled for the first time in the event's history due to the COVID-19 pandemic. This cost the economy of Alice Springs about A$8 million. In 2021 about 200 Victorian competitors, plus race officials, were unable to attend when the Northern Territory classed all of Victoria as a hot spot after the state entered its fourth lockdown.

2021 fatal crash 
During the 2021 race, one of the racing vehicles struck spectators just 35 kilometres short of the finish line. One person was killed and two others, including the driver, hospitalised. The remainder of the event was subsequently cancelled, meaning the bike race was not completed and no winner announced that category. The buggy category had already been won earlier that morning. The winning racer, Toby Price, had previously won in the bike category six times, and therefore became the first person to have won in both the bike and buggy categories.

Winners  
1976 BIKES
Geoff Curtis, Yamaha 250, NT
1977 BIKES
Phil Stoker, Suzuki 370, NT
1978 BIKES
Geoff Curtis, Yamaha XT500, NT
1979 BIKES
Peter Stayt, Yamaha XT500, NT
1980 BIKES
Geoff Curtis, Yamaha 400, NT
1981 BIKES
Phil Lovett, KTM 390, NSW
1982 BIKES
Phil Lovett, KTM 495, NSW
1983 BIKES
Stephen Gall, Yamaha 490, NSW
1984 BIKES
Peter Stayt, Yamaha 490, NT
1985 BIKES
Phil Lovett, KTM 495, NSW  time 03:41:30
1986 BIKES
Stephen Gall, Yamaha XT500, NSW
1987 BIKES
David Armstrong, Kawasaki 500, QLD
1988 
BIKES – Alan Roe, Honda 500, NT             
CARS – John Fidler/Peter Lewis, Corvette, NT
1989
BIKES – Mark Winter, Honda 500, NT
CARS – Gary Nicolle/Jo Reed, Buggy, NT
1990
BIKES – Mark Winter, KTM 540, NT
CARS – Gary Nicolle/Neil Shegog, Buggy, NT
1991
BIKES – Randall Gregory, Honda 500, NT
CARS – Keith Poole/Peter Walker, Buggy, SA
1992
BIKES – Randall Gregory, Honda 500, NT
CARS – Greg Schlein/David Fellows, Buggy, NT
1993
BIKES – Randall Gregory, Honda 500, NT
CARS – Steven Graydon/Tony Graydon, Buggy, WA
1994
BIKES -  Randall Gregory, Honda 500, NT 
1995
BIKES – Randall Gregory, Honda 500, NT 
1996
BIKES – Dan Ashcraft, Honda 500, USA 
1997
BIKES – Stephen Greenfield, Honda 500, NT 
1998
BIKES – Stephen Greenfield, Honda 500, NT 
1999
BIKES – Rick Hall, Honda 500, NT 
2000
BIKES – Stephen Greenfield, Honda CR500, NT 
2001
BIKES – Michael Vroom, Honda CR500, NT 
2002
BIKES – Rick Hall, Honda CR500, NT
2003
BIKES – Darren Griffiths, KTM 540, WA
2004
BIKES – Stephen Greenfield, Honda CRF 450, NT 
2005
BIKES – Jason Hill, Honda CRF 450, NT 
2006 
BIKES – Ryan Branford, Honda CRF 450, NT 
2007 
BIKES – Ben Grabham, Honda CRF450R, NSW 
2008
BIKES – Ben Grabham, Honda CRF450R , NSW  time 4:04:43.02
2009
BIKES – Ben Grabham,  KTM 505 XC-F, NSW  time 4:01:26.60
2010
BIKES – Toby Price, KTM 450 SX-F , NSW time 4:03:25.62
2011
BIKES -  Ben Grabham, KTM 450 SX-F , NSW  time 3:58:59.60 
2012
BIKES – Toby Price, KTM 450SXF, NSW time 3:57:03
2013
BIKES – Todd Smith, Honda CRF450R, NSW time 04:02:08
2014
BIKES – Toby Price, KTM 500EXC, NSW time 03:56:29 
2015
BIKES – Toby Price, KTM 500EXC, NSW time 03:52:54 
2016
BIKES – Toby Price, KTM 500EXC, NSW time 03:46:55 
2017
BIKES – Daymon Stokie, YAMAHA WR500F, NT time 04:11:12 
2018
BIKES – Toby Price, KTM 500EXC-F, NSW time 03:55:25.1
2019
BIKES – David Walsh, KTM 500EXC, NSW time 03:56:01
2020
BIKES – Not run due to COVID-19 pandemic lockdown
2021
BIKES – David Walsh, KTM
CARS – Toby Price
2022
CARS – Toby Price

See also
 Australian Off Road Championship

References

External links
 

Rally raid races
Motorcycle races
Auto races in Australia
Sports competitions in the Northern Territory
Sport in Alice Springs
Motorsport in the Northern Territory
Motorcycle racing in Australia